Sauzet is the name of several communes in France:

 Sauzet, in the Drôme department
 Sauzet, in the Gard department
 Sauzet, in the Lot department